Chef's Special is a Spanish film directed by Nacho García Velilla that centers on homosexuality and the decision to come out. It focuses on men who have had relationships with women to hide their own sexuality, to the point of even having kids. The film also deals with the theme of single parents. It stars Javier Cámara, Benjamín Vicuña, Lola Dueñas, and Fernando Tejero. The film premiered in Spain on April 11, 2008 and was a success in the box office, earning almost 1 million Euros in its first weekend and ending the year as the sixth highest-grossing Spanish film grossing 5,107,626.41 €. It received fourteen award nominations—including two Goya Awards—winning six of them. The critical reception was not as favorable, receiving negative reviews from important publications like El País, El Mundo, and ABC.

Plot

Maxi (Javier Cámara) is the chef and owner of a restaurant, Xantarella, who aspires to win a Michelin Star but is having financial difficulties. He helps Álex (Lola Dueñas), a maître d’ who is desperately looking for a boyfriend. It has been a while since Maxi has come out of the closet and declared his homosexuality. Since then, he left behind his wife and his two children whom he hasn't seen in the last seven years. His wife's death leads him to have to take care of his two estranged kids. Meanwhile, an Argentinian soccer player, Horacio (Benjamín Vicuña), comes into Maxi and Alex's lives and passes himself off as heterosexual when in reality he's homosexual. The film develops from the love triangle formed between Maxi, Álex, and Horacio, Maxi's responsibility to his kids, and the future of the restaurant.

External links 

2008 films
Gay-related films
Spanish LGBT-related films
2000s Spanish-language films
2000s Spanish films
Films about chefs
2008 LGBT-related films